The following is a list of medalists at the 1976 Summer Olympics, held in the city of Montreal, Quebec, Canada from July 17 to August 1.

{| id="toc" class="toc" summary="Contents"
|align="center" colspan=3|Contents
|-
|
Aquatics
Archery
Athletics
Basketball
Boxing
Canoeing
Cycling
|valign=top|
Equestrian
Fencing
Field hockey
Football
Gymnastics
Handball
Judo
|valign=top|
Modern pentathlon
Rowing
Sailing
Shooting
Volleyball
Weightlifting
Wrestling
|-
|align=center colspan=3|References
|}


Aquatics

Diving

Men

Women

Swimming

Men's events

Women's events

Water polo

Archery

Athletics

Men

Women

Basketball

Boxing

Canoeing

Men's events

Women's events

Cycling

Equestrian

Fencing

Men's events

Women's events

Field hockey

Football

Gymnastics

Men's events

Women's events

Handball

Judo

Modern pentathlon

Rowing

Men's events

Women's events

Sailing

Shooting

Volleyball

Weightlifting

Wrestling

Freestyle

Greco-Roman

See also
 1976 Summer Olympics medal table

External links

Medalists
1976